"Strange Days" is a song by the Doors, released in 1967 as the first track on the album of the same name. AllMusic critic Tom Maginnis, wrote that the song seems to find lead singer Jim Morrison "pondering the state of the then emerging hippie youth culture and how they are perceived by mainstream or 'straight' society". The track is also recognised as one of the earliest showcases for the use of the Moog synthesizer, which Morrison plays.

Composition

The song's lyrics have been overviewed, notably by Tom Maginnis as being inspired following a visitation of the Doors in New York City. Along with other album tracks, "Strange Days" was composed before the date when it was recorded; a live performance recorded in May 1966 was captured on the album London Fog 1966, released later in 2016.

The track is known for its distinctive usage of the Moog synthesizer which was made available the same year of the song's recording. In the Doors' biography No One Here Gets Out Alive, authors Danny Sugerman and Jerry Hopkins, described "Strange Days" as "one of the earliest examples of the Moog synthesizer in rock". The synth was provided by Jim Morrison to filter his vocals by playing notes, and it was hooked up with the help of Paul Beaver. Doors' engineer Bruce Botnick recalled the instrument's contribution:

Music videos
Two music videos were made for the song. The first featured footage of the band backstage and onstage, as well as Jim Morrison driving his car into a hole in sand and jumping on the hood in frustration. The second features the same circus performers on the Strange Days cover photo, who would explore New York City. It also included footage of various people, which was made "swervy" and distorted to fit in with the strange theme of the song. All of this new footage was mixed with footage of the old video, and re-released as a re-mixed video.

Strange 2013

In 2012, the surviving members of the Doors—Ray Manzarek, Robby Krieger and John Densmore, assembled in Los Angeles, California's Village Recorders recording studio with rapper Tech N9ne and producer Fredwreck to record a reworked version of the song. The rapper had intentions on building off "People Are Strange", but Krieger suggested using "Strange Days" instead, as it had "more of a driving beat".

This version was titled "Strange 2013" and includes vocals of Doors frontman Morrison, appearing on the rapper's 2013 album Something Else. While speaking on the collaboration, the rapper noted how the band has inspired him over the years, explaining that "People Are Strange" and "Strange Days" were what he drew on when naming his record label Strange Music.

References

The Doors songs
Songs written by John Densmore
Songs written by Robby Krieger
Songs written by Ray Manzarek
Songs written by Jim Morrison
Song recordings produced by Paul A. Rothchild
1967 songs